Castle Rock may refer to:

Geography

Islands
 Castle Rock (Alaskan Island), an island off the coast of the U.S. state of Alaska
 Castle Rock, Hong Kong (螺洲白排), an island of Hong Kong, part of the Po Toi Islands
 Castle Rock (Massachusetts), an island in the U.S. state of Massachusetts

Mountains and rock outcroppings
 Castle Rock (Antarctica), near McMurdo Station, Antarctica
 Castle Rock (South Shetland Islands), Antarctica
 Castle Rock, Western Australia, in the Porongurup Range, Australia
 Castle Rock (volcano), a volcanic plug in British Columbia, Canada
 Castle Rock (Waikato), a volcanic plug on the Coromandel Peninsula, New Zealand
 Te Tihi-o-Kahukura / Castle Rock, a rock outcrop in the Port Hills; see List of dual place names in New Zealand
 Castle Rock (Edinburgh), the site of Edinburgh Castle, Scotland, U.K.
 Castle Rock of Triermain, a crag on Watson's Dodd in the English Lake District, U.K.

United States
 Castle Rock Butte, a summit in South Dakota
 Castle Rock (Chelan County), a mountain summit in Washington
 Castle Rock (Colorado), a butte near the city of Castle Rock
 Castle Rock (Kansas), near the town of Quinter in northwestern Kansas
 Castle Rock (Michigan), a tourist attraction with steps for climbing north of St. Ignace
 Castle Rock (New York), an elevation located in Hamilton County
 Castle Rock (Utah), a landmark at Lake Powell
 Castle Rock, also known as Castleton Tower, adjacent to Castle Valley
 Caudy's Castle ("Castle Rock"), a sandstone outcrop in Hampshire County, West Virginia 
 Castle Rock (Pineville, West Virginia)

Parks
 Castle Rock Hoodoos Provincial Park, near Kamloops, British Columbia, Canada
 Castle Rock National Wildlife Refuge, near Crescent City, California
 Castle Rock Park, near Walnut Creek, California
 Castle Rock State Park (California), near Saratoga, California
 Castle Rock State Park (Illinois)

Settlements
 Castle Rock, British Columbia, Canada
 Castle Rock, Karnataka, India
 Castle Rock railway station, Karnataka
 Castlerock, Northern Ireland
 Castlerock railway station

United States
 Castle Rock, Colorado
 Castle Rock, Missouri
 Castle Rock, Oregon (disambiguation)
 Castle Rock, South Dakota
 Castle Rock, Washington
 Castle Rock, Wisconsin, town
 Castle Rock (community), Wisconsin
 Castle Rock Township, Dakota County, Minnesota

Other locations
 Castle Rock (Garrison, New York), a historic house in the Hudson Highlands
 Castlerock railway station, a railway station in County Londonderry, Northern Ireland

Fiction
 Castle Rock (Stephen King), the fictional Maine town in many Stephen King works
 Castle Rock (TV series), the American television series based on Stephen King's fictional town
 Castle Rock, the mountain in William Golding's 1954 novel Lord of the Flies; inspiration for Stephen King's later use

Music
 "Castle Rock", a 1951 song recorded by Frank Sinatra and Harry James
 "Cut Some Rug/Castle Rock", a 1996 double A-side single by the United Kingdom band The Bluetones
 Castle Rock (album), a 1955 album by American jazz saxophonist Johnny Hodges

Other
 Castle Rock Brewery, a microbrewery located in Nottingham, England
 Castle Rock Entertainment, a film production company founded by Rob Reiner and named after Stephen King's fictional town
 Castle Rock Estate, an Australian winery based at Porongurup
 Castle Rock Foundation, an American conservative foundation
 The Castle Rock School, an English school located in Coalville
 Town of Castle Rock v. Gonzales, a 2005 United States Supreme Court decision
 Castle Rock Winery, an American winery based in California
 USS Castle Rock (AVP-35), a United States Navy seaplane tender in commission from 1944 to 1946